Tamworth is a split-level railway station which serves the town of Tamworth in Staffordshire, England. It is an interchange between two main lines; the Cross Country Route and the Trent Valley section of the West Coast Main Line (WCML). It has four platforms: Two low-level platforms (1 and 2) on the WCML, and, at a right-angle to, and passing over these, are two high-level platforms (3 and 4) served by the Cross Country Route. Historically there were chords connecting the two lines, but there is no longer any rail connection between them.

History
The original station was opened on 12 August 1839  by the Birmingham and Derby Junction Railway, a forerunner of the Midland Railway, on its original route from Derby to Hampton-in-Arden meeting the London and Birmingham Railway for London. Later, in 1842, the B&DJ built a branch to Birmingham, terminating at Lawley Street railway station. 

On 26 June 1847 the London and North Western Railway opened its Trent Valley Line  passing at a right angle beneath the original Birmingham and Derby line with a new joint station designed by John William Livock.

The joint station did not acquire the "High Level" and "Low Level" names until 1924. Since it was expected that only local trains would call, the low level platforms were on loops, with the running lines left clear for expresses. At that time there was a north to west curve linking the, by then, Midland Railway line with the LNWR line. This curve was opened in 1847, and closed in March 1969.

A north to east curve was also constructed, however it's unclear whether this chord was ever completed, let alone used. It appeared to have been built by the Midland Railway in around 1866, and track was laid on it, but for unknown reasons the junction to the Trent Valley Line appears to have never been completed. Some sources state that the tracks were lifted in 1878, certainly it was listed on maps as being dismantled by 1901.

Since Tamworth was the crossing of two major lines – one Bristol to Newcastle, the other Euston to Aberdeen – it was an important transfer station for the Royal Mail, with upwards of 2,000 bags of mail being transferred between the two lines every night by the 1950s. Mail lifts were provided between the low and high level lines to facilitate the transfer.

There was a large water tower and pumping station at the east end of the low level, pumping water from the River Anker below.

The original station was demolished in 1961 and a new station, built in functional style was designed by the architects for the London Midland Region of British Railways, Maurice Wheeler, E.G. Girdlestone and J.B. Sanders. The rebuilt station opened in 1962 and at the same time the Trent Valley Line was electrified, requiring the High level line and platforms to be raised by two feet.

Accidents and incidents

On 14 September 1870, a mail train was diverted into a siding due to a signalman's error. It crashed through the buffers and ended up in the River Anker. Three people were killed.

Layout 

There are four platforms:
Platforms 1 and 2 on the low level (the West Coast Main Line):
Platforms 3 and 4 on the high level (on the Cross Country Route):

Facilities

The main buildings are adjacent to platform 1 and incorporate a ticket office (staffed seven days per week – 06:10 to 20:00 Mondays to Saturdays and 09:45 – 16:15 Sundays), customer service enquiry counter, photo booth, toilets, post box and a coffee shop.  Two self-service ticket machines are sited on the station frontage for use when the ticket office is closed.  Platform 2 only has a waiting shelter, whilst both high level platforms have waiting rooms.  Train running information is provided via automatic announcements, CIS displays and timetable poster boards.

Both low-level platforms are directly linked with both high-level platforms by staircases (4 in total). All platforms are fully accessible for disabled passengers, as the two levels are also linked by lifts (3 in total). There is, however, no direct lift between platforms 2 and 3; step-free access between these platforms is only via platforms 4 and 1.

Services

Low level

West Midlands Trains

West Midlands Trains operating under the London Northwestern branding, operates a regular Monday to Sunday semi-fast hourly service between London and Crewe via Stafford which calls at Tamworth. This service uses Class 350 multiple units.

Avanti West Coast
Avanti West Coast provide additional services during the peak hours and weekends. Westbound, there are:

 1 train per day from London to  via  (Monday to Friday only);
 1 train per day from London to  via  (Monday to Friday only);
 1 train per day from London to  via , which stops to set down only (Monday to Friday only).

Eastbound, there are:

All Avanti West Coast services are operated by Class 390 Pendolinos.

High level

Northbound, the typical Monday-Saturday frequency of services is as follows:

 2 trains per hour to Nottingham via Derby;

On Sundays this is reduced to 1 train per hour to Nottingham and 1 train per 2 hours to Glasgow.

Southbound, the typical Monday-Saturday frequency of services is as follows:

 1 train per hour to  only;
Peak-time services are extended to Penzance.

On Sundays the hourly service to Birmingham does not operate.

See also
Dudley Port railway station, which also had 2 levels until the 1960s.
Retford railway station, on 2 levels since the 1960s (previously a flat crossing).
Lichfield Trent Valley railway station
Smethwick Galton Bridge railway station, on 2 levels, opened in 1995.
Shotton railway station
Bolehall Viaduct just south of the high level station

References

External links

Railway stations in Staffordshire
DfT Category C2 stations
Former London and North Western Railway stations 
Former Midland Railway stations 
Railway stations in Great Britain opened in 1839 
Railway stations in Great Britain opened in 1847 
Railway stations served by CrossCountry
Railway stations served by Avanti West Coast
Railway stations served by West Midlands Trains
1847 establishments in England
John William Livock buildings
Buildings and structures in Tamworth, Staffordshire
Stations on the West Coast Main Line